Bernard A. Galler ( in Chicago –  in Ann Arbor, Michigan) was an American mathematician and computer scientist at the University of Michigan who was involved in the development of large-scale operating systems and computer languages including the MAD programming language and the Michigan Terminal System operating system.

Education and career
Galler attended the University of Chicago where he earned a BSc in mathematics at the University of Chicago (1947), followed by a MSc  from UCLA and a PhD from the University of Chicago (1955), advised by Paul Halmos and Marshall Stone. He joined the mathematics department at the University of Michigan (1955) where he taught the first programming course (1956) using an IBM 704. Galler helped to develop the computer language called the Michigan Algorithm Decoder (1959-) in use at several universities. He formed the Communication Sciences dept (1965), renamed Computer Sciences (CS), which became the Computer and Communications (CCS) dept (1984), and Computer Science Department in the 70s, where he retired in 1994. 

Galler's class developed the realtime course scheduling program called Computer Registration Involving Student Participation (CRISP) which allowed students to register for courses without waiting in long lines. The University used the CRISP application for over fifteen years.

From 1968 to 1970, Prof. Galler was the President of the Association for Computing Machinery (ACM). In 1994 he was inducted as a Fellow of the Association for Computing Machinery. He was the founding editor of the journal IEEE Annals of the History of Computing (1979–87). He was also the President of the Software Patent Institute (1992). 
For fifteen years, he served as an expert witness in numerous important legal cases around the country involving computer software issues.

Personal life
Galler was married to Enid Harris, played violin  in several orchestras and chamber groups, co-founded the Ypsilanti Youth Orchestra (2001) for children 
whose schools did not have string music education.  He was  president of the Orchestra Board at the University of Michigan and a member of the Ann Arbor chapter of Rotary International.  He died from pulmonary embolism.

The Bernard A. Galler Fellowship Fund  has been established at the University of Michigan Department of Electrical Engineering and Computer Science to "attract and support outstanding graduate students pursuing an advanced degree in computer science."

References

External links

 Oral history interview with Bernard A. Galler Charles Babbage Institute, University of Minnesota, Minneapolis.  Galler describes the development of computer science at the University of Michigan from the 1950s through the 1980s and discusses his own work in computer science.  Galler also discusses Michigan's relationship with ARPANET, CSNET, and BITNET. He describes the atmosphere on campus in the 1960s and early 1970s and his various administrative roles at the university. Galler discusses his involvement with the Association for Computing Machinery, the American Federation of Information Processing Societies, the founding of the Charles Babbage Institute, and his work with the Annals of the History of Computing.
 A Day in the Life of Bernard Galler, ACM Crossroads (no date)
 The Mathematics Genealogy Project: Bernard Galler, Department of Mathematics, North Dakota State University
 Bernard A. Galler, DBLP Computer Science Bibliography
 Bernard Galler's obituary  in the University Record, University of Michigan, Ann Arbor, November 8, 2006.

1928 births
2006 deaths
American computer scientists
20th-century American educators
20th-century American mathematicians
21st-century American mathematicians
Deaths from pulmonary embolism
Scientists from Chicago
People from Ann Arbor, Michigan
University of Chicago alumni
University of Michigan faculty
Fellows of the Association for Computing Machinery
Presidents of the Association for Computing Machinery
University of California, Los Angeles alumni
Engineers from Illinois
Mathematicians from Illinois